Kampong Chai Chee Constituency was a single member constituency within Bedok, Singapore. It was carved from Tampines and Siglap divisions in prior to 1968 general election as the population in Bedok grows. In 1988, the constituency was merged into Bedok Group Representation Constituency.

Member of Parliament

Elections

Elections in 1960s

Elections in 1970s

Elections in 1980s

Notes: United Front was subsequently renamed into Singapore United Front.

See also
Bedok SMC
Bedok GRC
East Coast GRC

References

Bedok
Singaporean electoral divisions